Carl Friedrich Schmid (22 April 1840 – 31 March 1897) was a Baltic German chess player.

Born in Mitau, Russian Empire (today Jelgava, Latvia), he tied for 15-16th at Wiesbaden 1880 (Joseph Henry Blackburne, Berthold Englisch, and Adolf Schwarz won), and took 16th in the Berlin 1881 chess tournament (the 2nd DSB Congress, Blackburne won).

References

1840 births
1897 deaths
Sportspeople from Jelgava
Chess players from the Russian Empire
Baltic-German people
19th-century chess players